Mike is an American miniseries created by Steven Rogers. The series is an unauthorized look at the life of boxer Mike Tyson, with Trevante Rhodes as the titular role, and co-stars Russell Hornsby. Rogers reunites with numerous collaborators from the film I, Tonya (2017), including director Craig Gillespie, and executive producers Tom Ackerley, Margot Robbie, and Bryan Unkeless. It premiered on Hulu on August 25, 2022. The series received mixed reviews from critics, and was 
heavily criticized by Tyson for being made without his involvement nor compensation.

Cast

Main 

 Trevante Rhodes as Mike Tyson
 Russell Hornsby as Don King

Recurring 

 Harvey Keitel as Cus D'Amato
 Laura Harrier as Robin Givens
 Grace Zabriskie as Camille D'Amato
 Oluniké Adeliyi as Lorna Mae, the mother of Mike Tyson
 TJ Atoms as Barkim, a friend
 Li Eubanks as Desiree Washington

Episodes 
Eight episodes have been announced.

Release
Mike was released on Disney+ internationally as a Star Original and on Star+ in Latin America the same day it debuted on Hulu in the US.

Reception

Critical reception 
The review aggregator website Rotten Tomatoes reported a 44% approval rating based on 32 critic reviews, with an average rating of 6.30/10. The website's critics consensus reads, "This unauthorized biopic of The Baddest Man on the Planet is undeniably ambitious as it weighs the legendary boxer's many contradictions, but it ultimately punches itself out with uneven execution." Metacritic, which uses a weighted average, assigned a score of 54 out of 100 based on 22 critic reviews, indicating "mixed or average reviews".

Reaction from Mike Tyson 
Tyson was not involved with the series and criticized Hulu for producing it.

Accolades

References

External links 
 Mike on Hulu
 

2020s American television miniseries
2022 American television series debuts
2022 American television series endings
English-language television shows
American biographical series
American sports television series
Boxing television series
Hulu original programming
Television series by 20th Century Fox Television
Television series based on actual events
Cultural depictions of Mike Tyson